A yoetzet halacha (Hebrew: יועצת הלכה, plural: yoatzot; lit. Advisor in Jewish law) is a woman certified to serve as an advisor to women with questions regarding taharat hamishpacha (family purity, also referred to as niddah).

Overview
The role of the yoetzet halacha is somewhat circumscribed. As titled, it is advisory: yoatzot convey information for clear-cut situations, and take the more complicated questions to a talmid chacham (Torah Scholar) equipped to discern and decide between competing halachic arguments.
The Halachot (laws) here, are a standard component of Rabbinical education - see under  and  - and Yoatzot receive corresponding training.

Candidates for yoatzot halacha are chosen for their advanced Torah scholarship, leadership capabilities, and deep religious commitment. As professionals hired by synagogues, schools, and communities, the yoatzot respond to Orthodox women's questions about mikveh observance and Jewish law affecting couples, families, sexual relations, and women's medical issues.

Although many Halachic authorities within the Modern Orthodox community allow Yoatzot, others strongly oppose it.

Certification 
Nishmat is the only institution certifying women as yoatzot halacha. The program spans two years' of study - covering the traditional sources - with shiurim by Rabbi  Yaacov Warhaftig of Machon Ariel in Jerusalem, and parallel Chavruta-based study. On completion, candidates must pass a four-hour exam, administered by four testing rabbis.
At its founding, the program received the support of, amongst others, Rabbi Nahum Rabinovitch; its posek is Rabbi Yehuda Henkin.

References

External links
yoatzot.org - explanation on the Nishmat Website
Yoatzot: An Exchange - discussion on cross-currents.com by Yitzchok Adlerstein.

Hebrew words and phrases
Orthodox Jewish feminism
Jewish marital law
Jewish religious occupations
Jewish ritual purity law
Menstrual cycle
Modern Orthodox Judaism
Women rabbis and Torah scholars